Epping Football Club is an Australian rules football club located in the suburb of Epping in the outer northern suburbs of Melbourne. It plays in the Northern Football League (formerly the Diamond Valley Football League).

History

The Epping Football Club was formed in 1895. The club began playing social matches up until joining the Whittlesea and District Football Association in 1904.  

In 1906 the Bourke-Evelyn Football Association was formed with Epping as one of the foundation teams.  The club remained in the Bourke-Evelyn Football Association until the league folded in 1932, winning 10 Premierships along the way.  

In 1933, Epping Football Club joined the Diamond Valley Football League and won the premiership in their first season. Epping won another five premierships up until 1981 when the league was split into two divisions. Epping has since won a further two premierships in Division Two. The club competed in Division One from 1991 until the end of the 2007 season before the Blues were relegated to Division Two.

After winning the Division Two Premiership in 2012, following a season in which they lost only once, the EFC made their way back up into Division One for the 2013 season.

Although winning four games in 2013, the Epping Football Club were relegated to Division 2 for 2014. Mario Bandera was replaced as senior coach by Steven "Freckle" Power, former Captain and Best & Fairest at the EFC.

Epping Football Club boasts a strong junior affiliate club – fielding 9 junior teams from the under 9s through to the under 15s, Auskick and a Youth Girls U14's team.

AFL representatives

Epping Football Club has been the home club of several footballers who have played in the VFL/AFL, including:
 Reg Milburn - Fitzroy Football Club
 Trevor Johnson - Melbourne Football Club
 Frank Vearing - Melbourne Football Club
 Brent Heaver – Melbourne, Carlton, and Port Adelaide
 Darren Cuthbertson – Melbourne
 Ricky Dyson – Essendon
 Kalev Vann – Fitzroy
 Jack Petruccelle - West Coast

References

External links

 Epping FC Website
 Northern Football Netball League

Northern Football League (Australia) clubs
Australian rules football clubs established in 1895
1895 establishments in Australia
Sport in the City of Whittlesea
Australian rules football clubs in Melbourne